Pterobilin is a blue bile pigment found in Nessaea spp., Graphium agamemnon, G. antiphates, G. doson, and G. sarpedon.  It is one of only a few blue pigments found in any animal species, as most animals use iridescence to create blue coloration.  Other blue pigments of animal origin include phorcabilin, used by other butterflies in Graphium and Papilio (specifically P. phorcas and P. weiskei), and sarpedobilin, which is used by Graphium sarpedon.

Synthetic pathways
Pterobilin 1 is a chemical precursor to sarpedobilin 3 in the larvae of the fourth instar of G. sarpedon through a double cyclisation of the central vinyl groups of the adjacent nitrogens.  In the butterfly species Pieris brassicae, it is produced starting with acetate and then proceeding to glycin, then δ-aminolevulinic acid, then coproporphyrinogen III, to protoporphyrin IX and finally into pterobilin.

Pterobilin 1 can be phototransformed into Pterobilin 2 and 3 in vitro.  Pterobilin 1 can also be thermally rearranged in vitro into phorcabilin 2.

Biochemical roles
Pterobilin in P. brassicae is thought to play a role in photoreception for the different instars for metering diapause.  In adult P. brassicae butterflies the compound is thought to have a role in heat transfer, as the wing scales where pterobilin accumulates differ morphologically in a way that would facilitate photoreception.

See also
 Basics of blue flower colouration
 Biliverdin

References

Graphium (butterfly)

Biological pigments
Biblidinae